YouthBuild is a non-profit organization which on a voluntary basis provides education, counseling and job skills to unemployed young American adults (between ages 16 and 24), generally high school dropouts. There are 273 YouthBuild programs in the United States, with a total capacity of about 10,000 students yearly, and there are similar programs underway in over 15 countries. The headquarters are in Somerville, Massachusetts.

The YouthBuild program has five components: construction, education, counseling, leadership, and graduate opportunity.  Students spend every other week on a job site, learning the construction trade by building homes for their own communities.  This creates housing for low-income people, and also gives the students marketable job skills.  The alternate weeks are spent on education in the YouthBuild classroom, with the goal of attaining a GED or completing their high school diploma.  Many YouthBuild students come directly from the streets or from difficult life situations, so counseling is available to help them deal with anger management, family responsibilities, and other adjustment / life direction issues.  Leadership is taught explicitly in YouthBuild programs, based on the philosophy that young people are not a burden, but rather a resource to be tapped.  This, combined with ensuring opportunity and placement for graduates, means that many YouthBuild graduates go on to college, work in the non-profit sector, serve on committees, or even run in local politics.

Funding for YouthBuild previously came primarily from the Department of Housing and Urban Development, but has transitioned to the Department of Labor.  Other funding sources for programs are widely varied, but include other government agencies, private foundations, corporations, and individual donors.

Founded and directed by Dorothy Stoneman and John Bell, one of the main purposes of YouthBuild is to build affordable housing for low-income families. Since 1994, more than 19,000 homes have been built by 92,000 YouthBuild students.

References

Further reading

 Bell, J. (n.d.). The birth of YouthBuild: The story of Dorothy Stoneman & Chantay Henderson Jones. Somerville, MA: YouthBuild USA.
 Bridgespan Group. (2005). Youthbuild USA: Achieving significant scale while guiding a national movement. Author.
 Center for the Advancement of Social Entrepreneurship (CASE), Fuqua School of Business, Duke University. (2004a). Appendix A: The core YouthBuild model. Durham, NC: Author.
 Center for the Advancement of Social Entrepreneurship (CASE), Fuqua School of Business, Duke University. (2004b). Appendix B: Housing and community act of 1992 subtitle D – Hope for youth: YouthBuild. Durham, NC: Author.
 Center for the Advancement of Social Entrepreneurship (CASE), Fuqua School of Business, Duke University. (2004c). Appendix C: The YouthBuild organization as of 2002. Durham, NC: Author.
 Center for the Advancement of Social Entrepreneurship (CASE), Fuqua School of Business, Duke University. (2004d). The growth of YouthBuild: A case study. Durham, NC: Author.
 Cohen, M.A., & Piquero, A.R. (2007). New evidence on the monetary value of saving a high risk youth. Unpublished manuscript.
 Cohen, M.A., & Piquero, A.R. (2008). Costs and benefits of a targeted intervention program for youthful offenders: The YouthBuild USA offender project. Unpublished manuscript.
 Crutchfield, L.R., & McLeod Grant, H. (2008). Forces for good: The six practices of high-impact nonprofits. San Francisco: Jossey-Bass.
 Ferguson, R.F., Clay, P.L., Snipes, J.C., & Roaf, P. (1996). YouthBuild in development perspective: A formative evaluation of the YouthBuild demonstration. Cambridge, MA: Department of Urban Studies & Planning, Massachusetts Institute of Technology. (ERIC Document Reproduction Service No. ED413381).
 Hahn, A., & Leavitt, T. (2007). The efficacy of education awards in YouthBuild AmeriCorps programs. Waltham, MA: Center for Youth and Communities, Heller School for Social Policy and Management, Brandeis University.
 Hahn, A., Leavitt, T.D., Horvat, E.M., & Davis, J.E. (2004). Life after YouthBuild: 900 Youthbuild graduates reflect on their lives, dreams, and experiences. Somerville, MA: YouthBuild U.S.A.
 Leslie, A. (2007). YouthBuild USA youthful offender project year 1. Somerville, MA: YouthBuild U.S.A.
 Lewis, M., & Gilson, B. (2002). Taking the YouthBuild challenge. MakingWaves, 13(2), 41–45.
 Minnesota Department of Employment and Economic Development. (2003). Minnesota YouthBuild program: A measurement of costs and benefits to the state of Minnesota. State of Minnesota.
 Mitchell, M.V. Jenkins, D., Nguyen, D., Lerman, A., & DeBerry, M. (2003). Evaluation of the Youthbuild "program". Office of Policy Development and Research, U.S. Department of Housing and Urban Development.
 Stoneman, D. (2002). The YouthBuild story of thanks. Somerville, MA: YouthBuild U.S.A.
 U.S. Department of Housing and Urban Development. (1996). Youthbuild Program Manual. Washington, DC: Office of Community Planning and Development, U.S. Department of Housing and Urban Development.

External links
YouthBuildTv
YouthBuild's official web site

AmeriCorps organizations
Non-profit organizations based in Massachusetts
Service year programs in the United States